Dennis Gorsline (born April 9, 1943) is an American football coach.  He was the head football coach at the Martin Luther College in New Ulm, Minnesota. He began his tenure in 1972 when he resurrected the program after it had been shut down in 1937 and ended when he retired from full-time coaching in 2003.

Head coaching record

College

References

1943 births
Living people
Martin Luther Knights football coaches
Northern Michigan Wildcats football players
Sportspeople from Saginaw, Michigan
Players of American football from Michigan
Coaches of American football from Michigan